Ishaq Beg Munonov, also Isḥāq Beg, (Kyrgyz: ىساقبەك مونونوۋ/Isakbek Mononov;) (1902 or 1903–1949) was an ethnic Kyrgyz leader in Xinjiang, China during the first half of the 20th century.

Early life
Ishaq Beg Munonov was a native of Ulugqat in western Xinjiang. Shortly after the Russian Revolution of 1917, he moved to the Soviet Union to study and became a follower of Marxism. After returning to China in 1922, he was imprisoned for espousing revolutionary beliefs and urging the Kyrgyz to rise up against Xinjiang governor Jin Shuren. He later served as a regiment and then a brigade commander in the army of Sheng Shicai who supplanted Jin Shuren as governor in 1933. Some sources say that Ishaq Beg was a spy sent by Soviet intelligence to Xinjiang to support Sheng Shicai.

Ishaq Beg was a capable commander but aroused the suspicion of Sheng Shicai, who removed his military post and reassigned him to Yining to serve as the head of the Kazakh-Kyrgyz Cultural Society. In Yining, Ishaq Beg was under government surveillance.

Ili Uprising
In 1943, he secretly returned to southern Xinjiang and organized a militia called the Puli Liberation Organization in Tashkurgan where he led a rebellion in June 1944. After the outbreak of the Soviet-backed Ili Rebellion in November 1944, he became a deputy commander-in-chief of the Ili National Army. The uprising gave rise to the Second East Turkestan Republic (ETR). Ishaq Beg was a member of the pro-Soviet progressive faction within the ETR. He reportedly held both Chinese and Soviet citizenship. In the summer of 1945, he directed the Battle of Jinghe-Wusu. 

In June 1946, the revolutionaries of the ETR, which controlled three of Xinjiang's 10 districts, and the Nationalist Chinese government, which held the other seven districts, reached a peace agreement and formed a coalition government in Xinjiang. Soviet advisors departed the Ili National Army and Ishaq Beg became the commander-in-chief.

In August 1949, as the Chinese Communist Party (CCP) gained the upper hand of the Chinese Civil War, the CCP and the Ili leadership began discussing cooperation. The CCP's delegate to Ili, Deng Liqun, stayed at the home of Ishaq Beg in Yining. He conveyed Mao Zedong's invitation of the Ili leaders to attend a planning conference for the founding of the People's Republic of China.

Ishaq Beg Munonov was part of the leadership delegation that left Yining on August 22, 1949 for Beiping. He, along with Ehmetjan Qasim, Abdulkerim Abbas, Dalelkhan Sugirbayev and Luo Zhi, was killed in a plane crash near Lake Baikal on or about August 26, 1949.

Legacy
In the People's Republic of China, Ishaq Beg is remembered as a martyr and hero in the struggle against the Nationalist regime. His remains were returned to China in April 1950 and later reburied in a martyrs' memorial cemetery in Yining. The cemetery has a stele with calligraphy by Mao Zedong, praising Ishaq Beg and his fellow martyrs for their contributions to the Chinese people’s revolution and mourning their death en route to the Inaugural Chinese People's Political Consultative Conference in Beijing.

References

Works referenced

1900s births
1949 deaths
Ethnic Kyrgyz people (individuals)
Political office-holders in Xinjiang
Ili National Army
Victims of aviation accidents or incidents in the Soviet Union
China–Soviet Union relations